Diamonds in the Sky is a 2018 Nigerian drama film directed by Kunle Afolayan and produced by Femi Adebayo. The film stars Femi Adebayo, Omowumi Dada, and Joke Silva with Ali Nuhu, Bolaji Oba, and Toyin Abraham in supporting roles. The film tells the story of three families where they struggle when cancer affects their lives.

The film received mostly positive critics acclaim and screened worldwide. The film was nominated for 11 Best of Nollywood Awards including Best Actress in a Supporting Role, Best Actress (English) and Best Director.

Cast
 Femi Adebayo as Kayode
 Omowumi Dada as Teniola
 Joke Silva as Aisha Dalhatu
 Ali Nuhu as Faisal Dalhaty
 Bolaji Oba as Ibrahim Dalhatu
 Toyin Abraham as Yesimi Gbeborun
 Yvonne Jegede as Halima 
 Mogaji Majinyawa as Uncle Idi
 Adebayo Salami as Kayode's Dad
 Ayo Mogaji as Kayode's Mum
 Kayode Olaiya as Akanbi Aliyu
 Bimbo Akintola as Labake Aliyu
 Yemi Shodimu as Brainmoh Soji
 Faith Oyeniran as Supo Akanbi
 Farid Olajogun as Rele Akanbi
 Ebun Oloyede as Salamander
 Adeola Okanipekun as Salewa
 Ayo Akinwale as Dr. Abdulabi
 Olayinka Yusuf as Foreman
 Adamu Suabu as Gateman
 Yemi Adeite as Housemaid
 Anuolowapo Janeth as Housemaid
 Bada Michael as Driver
 Ayomide A. Adebayo as Nurse

Awards and nominations

References

External links 
 

English-language Nigerian films
2019 films
2019 drama films
2010s English-language films